Cala Llombards is a beach and resort on the southeast coast of Majorca, located in Santanyí municipality. The village where it is located is called Es Llombards. The beach is relatively unknown by tourists and tends to be frequented by local holiday villa owners. The famous Finca Rustica is located in Cala Llombards.

References

External links
 Cala Llombards beach guide

Beaches of Mallorca
Beaches of the Balearic Islands
Populated places in Mallorca
Santanyí